Brough Motorcycles were made by William E. Brough in Nottingham, England, from 1902 to 1926 , after some earlier experimentation with motorised tricycles. The Brough Superior company was a separate company created by his son, George Brough.

Models up to end of WWI (up to 1918) 
The first Brough motorcycle was built in 1902, and had a single cylinder engine hung from the downtube. By 1908 there were a range of models with 2.5 hp and 3.5 hp single cylinder and 5 hp V-twin engines (all made by Brough). By 1912 there was a 6 hp V-twin, and an 8 hp engine was also made intended for use in the Brough Monocar.

In 1913 William Brough developed a flat-twin engine in-line with the frame. This 497cc engine had overhead valves, 70mm bore and 64.5mm stroke, and had a magneto fitted above and a 2-speed gearbox below. By the end of 1914 it had replaced all other engines in the Brough range, and using it only 3-models were planned for 1915. The three models were the HS - which was fitted with a two-speed countershaft gear operated by dog clutches, with chain drive to the gearbox, and John Bull rubber belt drive to the rear wheel over an adjustable pulley allowing the top gear range to be varied. No clutch or kick-start was provided. The second model was the HB, which was fitted with a Sturmey-Archer 3-speed hub gearbox and handle starter. The third model was the HTT, which was very similar to the HS but fitted with a specially tuned engine with high-compression, lightweight steel pistons, different camshafts, and special front cylinder lubrication.

During the war Brough introduced a larger flat-twin of 6 hp rating, with 70mm bore and 90mm stroke (692cc), it shared a lot in common with the earlier 6 hp V-twin.

Post-War 
At the end of 1918, Brough announced they would be initially concentrating production on their 3.5 hp (489cc) flat-twin motorcycle. This was bench tested at 14 bhp at 4200rpm, and it would go to 5600rpm, which was quite high but was guaranteed by George Brough 'to the extent of £100'. The engine had detachable heads with the valve seats integral and the rockers 'enclosed in neat aluminium cases'. Light aluminium pistons, roller bearing crankshaft, and two ball bearing mounted camshafts, are further indications of development work during the war.

Originally William Brough's son, George Brough, was a partner in his father's company, but he split from it in 1919 and started his own factory, also in Nottingham.  He named his motorcycles "Brough Superior".  Upon hearing the name of the new motorcycle company, his father made the comment, "I suppose that makes mine the Brough Inferior".

The two sizes of Brough flat-twin engine were still in production in 1922 when Brough announced a modified version with roller cam followers, light aluminium pistons, removable valve seats, and the engine base extended to mount the three-speed Sturmey-Archer gearbox. William Brough continued to produce motorcycles under the original "Brough" marque until 1926.

References

Defunct motorcycle manufacturers of the United Kingdom
Motor vehicle manufacturers of England
Companies based in Nottingham
Vehicle manufacturing companies established in 1908
Vehicle manufacturing companies disestablished in 1926
1908 establishments in England
1926 disestablishments in England
Defunct companies of England
British companies disestablished in 1926
British companies established in 1908